Lesotho competed at the 2018 Commonwealth Games in the Gold Coast, Australia from April 4 to April 15, 2018.

Competitors
The following is the list of number of competitors participating at the Games per sport/discipline.

Athletics

Men
Track & road events

Women
Track & road events

Field events

Boxing

Lesotho participated with a team of 6 athletes (5 men and 1 woman)

Men

Women

Cycling

Lesotho participated with 4 athletes (3 men and 1 woman).

Road

Mountain bike

Weightlifting

Lesotho competed in weightlifting.

See also
Lesotho at the 2018 Summer Youth Olympics

References

Nations at the 2018 Commonwealth Games
Lesotho at the Commonwealth Games
2018 in Lesotho sport